Diana Brydon is a Canadian literary scholar, currently a Canada Research Chair at University of Manitoba.

References

Year of birth missing (living people)
Living people
Academic staff of the University of Manitoba
21st-century Canadian historians